The Foothill Boulevard Milestone (Mile 11) is a milestone located on Colorado Boulevard west of Holliston Street in Pasadena, California. The milestone was placed along the Foothill Boulevard, one of six highways established and marked by the Highway Commission of Los Angeles County in the 1900s. Foothill Boulevard began in Los Angeles and passed through South Pasadena and Pasadena before turning east and running through the cities in the foothills of the San Gabriel Mountains. The milestone marked the point  from the Los Angeles County Courthouse in Los Angeles. In addition, the milestone marked the block number of the highway; each highway was marked using a block system that divided every mile of the road into ten blocks. After the Highway Commission disbanded in 1908, its highway system was largely forgotten. The Mile 11 marker is the only remaining milestone of the three placed by the commission in Pasadena.

The milestone was added to the National Register of Historic Places on April 19, 1996.

References

National Register of Historic Places in Pasadena, California
Transportation in Pasadena, California